Central Jakarta is one of the five administrative cities which form the Special Capital Region of Jakarta. It had 902,973 inhabitants according to the 2010 census and 1,056,896 at the 2020 census. Central Jakarta is not self-governed and does not have a city council, hence it is not classified as a proper municipality.

Central Jakarta is the smallest in area and population of the five cities of Jakarta. It is both the administrative and political center of Jakarta and Indonesia. Central Jakarta contains a number of large international hotels and major landmarks such as Hotel Indonesia.

Districts
Central Jakarta is bounded by North Jakarta to the north, East Jakarta to the east, South Jakarta to the south, and West Jakarta to the west. It is subdivided into eight districts, listed below with their areas and their populations at the 2010 census.

Demographics

Central Jakarta has an average of 20,177 residents per square kilometre in 2020, making it the most densely populated municipality in Jakarta.

Economy
Both GRDP at current market price and GRDP at 2000 constant price in 2007 for Municipality of Central Jakarta is higher than other municipalities in DKI Jakarta, which is Rp. 145 million and Rp. 80 million respectively.

At the end of the first quarter of 2010, the Jakarta CBD had an occupancy rate of 80%, an increase from the 78% at the end of the first quarter of 2009.

In September 2010, Jones Lang LaSalle estimated that the Jakarta CBD had  of serviced office space, making up less than 1 percent of the total amount of office space in the CBD. 70% of the tenants in the serviced spaces were international companies. The number of serviced office spaces in Central Jakarta increased by 50% in the year leading to September 2010.

Government and infrastructure

Government agencies with head offices in Central Jakarta include the National Search and Rescue Agency, which has its head office in Kemayoran, and the National Transportation Safety Committee (NTSC, Indonesian acronym KNKT), which has its head office in the Ministry of Transport Building.

See also
North Jakarta
South Jakarta
West Jakarta
East Jakarta
Jakarta

References

External links
  Official site
 

 
Provincial capitals in Indonesia